Robert Grimston may refer to:
Robert Grimston, 1st Baron Grimston of Westbury (1897–1979), British politician
Robert Grimston (cricketer) (1816–1884), English cricketer

See also 
Robert de Grimston (born 1935), founder of The Process Church of The Final Judgment